Otto Nossan Klemperer (14 May 18856 July 1973) was a conductor and composer, originally based in Germany, and then the US, Hungary and finally Britain. His early career was in opera houses, but he became better known as a concert-hall conductor.

A protégé of the composer and conductor Gustav Mahler, from 1907 Klemperer was appointed to a succession of increasingly senior conductorships in opera houses in and around Germany. Between 1929 to 1931 he was director of the Kroll Opera in Berlin, where he presented new works and avant-garde productions of classics. He was from a Jewish family, and the rise of the Nazis caused him to leave Germany in 1933. Shortly afterwards he was appointed chief conductor of the Los Angeles Philharmonic, and guest-conducted other American orchestras, including the San Francisco Symphony, the New York Philharmonic and later the Pittsburgh Symphony, which he reorganised as a permanent ensemble.

In the late 1930s Klemperer became ill with a brain tumour. An operation to remove it was successful, but left him lame and partly paralysed on his right side. Throughout his life he had bipolar disorder, and after the operation he went through an intense manic phase of the illness and then a long spell of severe depression. His career was seriously disrupted and did not fully recover until the mid-1940s. He served as the musical director of the Hungarian State Opera in Budapest from 1947 to 1950.

Klemperer's later career centred on London. In 1951 he began an association with the Philharmonia Orchestra. By that time better known for his readings of the core German symphonic repertoire than for experimental modern music, he gave concerts and made almost 200 recordings with the Philharmonia and its successor, the New Philharmonia, until his retirement in 1972. His approach to Mozart was not universally liked, being thought of by some as heavy, but he became widely considered the most authoritative interpreter of the symphonies of Beethoven, Brahms, Bruckner and Mahler.

Life and career

Early years
Otto Nossan Klemperer was born on 14 May 1885 in Breslau, Province of Silesia, in what was then the Imperial German state of Prussia; the city is now Wrocław, Poland. He was the second child and only son of Nathan Klemperer and his wife Ida, née Nathan. The family name had originally been Klopper, but was changed to Klemperer in 1787 in response to a decree by Emperor Joseph II aimed at assimilating Jews into Christian society. Nathan Klemperer was originally from Josefov, the ghetto in the Bohemian city of Prague; Ida was from a more prosperous Jewish family in Hamburg. Both parents were musical: Nathan sang and Ida played the piano.

When Klemperer was four the family moved from Breslau to Hamburg, where Nathan earned a modest living in commercial posts and his wife gave piano lessons. It was decided quite early in Klemperer's life that he would become a professional musician, and when he was about five he started piano lessons with his mother. At the Hoch Conservatory in Frankfurt he studied the piano with James Kwast and theory with Ivan Knorr. Kwast moved to Berlin, first to the Klindworth-Scharwenka Conservatory and then to the Stern Conservatory. Klemperer followed him at each move, and later credited him with the whole basis of his musical development. Among Klemperer's other teachers was Hans Pfitzner, with whom he studied composition and conducting.

In 1905 Klemperer met Gustav Mahler at a rehearsal of the latter's Second Symphony in Berlin. Oscar Fried conducted, and Klemperer was given charge of the off-stage orchestra. He later made a piano arrangement (now lost) of the symphony, which he played to the composer in 1907 when visiting Vienna. In the interim he made his public debut as a conductor in May 1906, taking over from Fried after the first night of the fifty-performance run of Max Reinhardt's production of Orpheus in the Underworld at the New Theatre, Berlin.

Mahler wrote a short testimonial, recommending Klemperer, on a small card which Klemperer kept for the rest of his life. On the strength of it he was appointed chorus master and assistant conductor at the New German Theatre in Prague in 1907.

German opera houses
From Prague, Klemperer moved to be assistant conductor at the Hamburg State Opera (1910–1912), where the sopranos Lotte Lehmann and Elisabeth Schumann made their joint débuts under his direction. His first chief conductorship was at Barmen (1912–1913), after which he moved to the much larger Strasbourg Opera (1914–1917) as deputy to Pfitzner. From 1917 to 1924 he was chief conductor of the Cologne Opera. During his Cologne years he married Johanna Geisler, a singer in the opera company, in 1919. She was a Christian, and he had converted from Judaism. He remained a practising Roman Catholic until 1967, when he left the faith and returned to Judaism. The couple had two children: Werner, who became an actor, and Lotte, who became her father's assistant and eventually carer. Johanna continued her operatic career, sometimes in performances conducted by her husband. She retired from singing by the mid-1930s. The couple remained close and mutually supportive until her death in 1956.

In 1923 Klemperer turned down an invitation to succeed Leo Blech as musical director of the Berlin State Opera because he did not believe he would be given enough artistic authority over productions. The following year he became conductor at the Prussian State Theatre in Wiesbaden (1924–1927), a smaller theatre than others in which he had worked, but one where he had the control he sought over stagings. There he conducted new, and often modernistic, productions of a range of operas from The Marriage of Figaro, Don Giovanni, Fidelio and Lohengrin to Elektra and The Soldier's Tale. He found his tenure there rewarding and fulfilling, later describing it as the happiest time in his career.

Klemperer visited Russia in 1924, conducting there during a six-week stay; he returned each year until 1936. In 1926 he made his American début, succeeding Eugene Goossens as guest conductor of the New York Symphony Orchestra. In his eight-week engagement with the orchestra he gave Mahler's Ninth Symphony and Janáček's Sinfonietta their first performances in the US.

Berlin
In 1927 the authorities in Berlin decided to establish a new opera company to complement the State Opera, highlighting new works and innovative productions. The company, officially Staatsoper am Platz der Republik, was better known as the Kroll Opera. Leo Kestenberg, the influential head of the Prussian Ministry of Culture, proposed Klemperer as its first director. Klemperer was offered a ten-year contract and accepted it on condition that he would be allowed to conduct orchestral concerts in the theatre, and that he could employ his chosen design and stage experts.

The conductor's biographer Peter Heyworth describes Klemperer's tenure at the Kroll as "of crucial significance in his career and the development of opera in the first half of the 20th century". In both concert and operatic performances Klemperer introduced much new music. Asked later which were the most important of the operas he introduced there, he listed:

In Heyworth's view, the modern approach to production at the Kroll − contrasting with conventional representational settings and costumes − exemplified in "a drastically stylised production" of Der fliegende Holländer in 1929 was "a decisive forerunner of Wieland Wagner's innovations at Bayreuth". The production divided critical opinion, which ranged from "A new outrage to a German masterpiece ... grotesque" to "an unusual and magnificent performance ... a fresh wind has blown tinsel and cobwebs away".

In 1929 Klemperer made his British début, conducting the London Symphony Orchestra in the first London performance of Bruckner's Eighth Symphony. Not all the British music critics were convinced by the symphony, but the conductor was widely praised for "the power of a dominating personality", "masterful control" and as "a great orchestral commander". A leading critic called for the BBC to give Klemperer a long-term appointment in London.

The Kroll Opera closed in 1931, ostensibly because of a financial crisis, although in Klemperer's view the motives were political. He said that Heinz Tietjen, director of the State Opera, told him that it was not, as Klemperer supposed, anti-Semitism that had worked against him: "No, that is not so important. It's your whole political and artistic direction they don't like." Klemperer's contract obliged him to transfer to the main State Opera, where, with such conductors as Bruno Walter, Wilhelm Furtwängler and Leo Blech already established, there was little important work for him. He remained there until 1933, when the rise of the Nazis caused him to leave for safety in Switzerland, joined by his wife and children.

Los Angeles
In exile from Germany, Klemperer found that conducting work was far from plentiful, although he secured some prestigious engagements in Vienna and at the Salzburg Festival. He was sounded out by William Andrews Clark, founder and sponsor of the Los Angeles Philharmonic, about becoming the orchestra's chief conductor in succession to Artur Rodziński, who was leaving to take over the Cleveland Orchestra. The Los Angeles orchestra was not then regarded as among the finest American ensembles, and the salary was less than Klemperer would have liked, but he accepted and sailed to the US in 1935.

The orchestra's finances were perilous; Clark had lost a substantial portion of his fortune in the Great Depression and could no longer afford subventions on the scale of earlier years. Despite box-office constraints, Klemperer successfully introduced unfamiliar works including Mahler's Das Lied von der Erde and Second Symphony, Bruckner's Fourth and Seventh Symphonies, and works by Stravinsky. He programmed music from Gurrelieder by his fellow exile and Los Angeles neighbour Arnold Schoenberg, although the composer complained that Klemperer did not perform his works more often. Klemperer insisted that the local public was not ready for such demanding music; Schoenberg did not bear a grudge and, as Klemperer always aspired to compose as well as to conduct, Schoenberg gave him composition lessons. Klemperer considered him "the greatest living teacher of composition, although ... he never mentioned the twelve-tone system". The musicologist Hans Keller nevertheless found "tonal varieties of the Schoenbergian method" used "penetratingly" in Klemperer's compositions.

In 1935, at Arthur Judson's invitation, Klemperer conducted the New York Philharmonic for four weeks. The orchestra's chief conductor, Arturo Toscanini, was in Europe and Klemperer took charge of the opening concerts of the season. The New York concert-going public was deeply conservative but despite Judson's warning that programming Mahler would be highly damaging at the box-office, Klemperer insisted on giving the Second Symphony. The notices praised the conducting – Oscar Thompson wrote in Musical America that the performance was the best he had heard since Mahler conducted the work in New York in 1906 – but the ticket sales were as poor as Judson had predicted, and the orchestra had a deficit of $5,000 from the concert. When Toscanini resigned from the orchestra the following year, Klemperer hoped to be considered as his successor, but recognised that after "this affair of the Mahler symphony" he would not be re-engaged. Nonetheless, when the then little-known John Barbirolli was announced as Toscanini's successor, Klemperer wrote a vehement letter to Judson protesting at being passed over.

Having returned to Los Angeles, Klemperer conducted the orchestra's concerts there and in out-of-town venues such as San Diego, Santa Barbara, Fresno and Claremont. He and the orchestra worked with leading soloists, including Artur Schnabel, Emanuel Feuermann, Joseph Szigeti, Bronisław Huberman and Lotte Lehmann. Pierre Monteux was conductor of the San Francisco Symphony and he and Klemperer guest-conducted each other's orchestras. After a concert under Klemperer in 1936, the San Francisco Chronicle'''s music critic hailed him as one of the world's greatest conductors, along with Furtwängler, Walter and Toscanini.

1938 to 1945
The governing board of the Pittsburgh Symphony approached Klemperer in early 1938, seeking his help in reconstituting the orchestra – an ad hoc group since 1927 – as a permanent ensemble. He held auditions in Pittsburgh and, more fruitfully, in New York, and after three weeks of intensive rehearsal the orchestra was ready for the opening concerts of the season, which he conducted. The results were highly successful, and he was offered a large salary to remain as the orchestra's chief conductor. He was contractually committed to Los Angeles, but contemplated taking on the direction of both orchestras. He decided against it and Fritz Reiner was appointed as conductor in Pittsburgh.

In 1939 Klemperer began to suffer from serious balance problems. A potentially fatal brain tumour was diagnosed and he travelled to Boston for an operation to remove it. The operation was successful, but left him lame and partly paralysed on his right side. He had long had bipolar disorder (in the parlance of the time he was "manic depressive") and after the operation he went through an intense manic phase of the illness, which lasted for nearly three years and was followed by a long spell of severe depression. In 1941, after he walked out of a mental sanatorium in Rye, New York, the local police put out an alarm, describing him as "dangerous and insane". He was found two days later in Morristown, New Jersey and appeared composed. A doctor who examined him said he was "temperamental and unstrung" but not dangerous, and he was released. The board of the Los Angeles orchestra terminated his contract, and his subsequent appearances were few, and seldom with prestigious ensembles, in Los Angeles or elsewhere. As her father struggled to support the family from his modest fees, Lotte worked in a factory to bring in some money.

Post-war

By 1946 Klemperer had recovered his health enough to return to Europe for a conducting tour. His first concert was in Stockholm, where he met the music scholar Aládar Tóth, husband of the pianist Annie Fischer; Tóth was soon to be an important influence on his career. On another tour in 1947 Klemperer conducted The Marriage of Figaro at the Salzburg Festival and Don Giovanni in Vienna. While he was in Salzburg, Tóth, who had been appointed director of the Hungarian State Opera in Budapest, invited him to become the company's musical director. Klemperer accepted, and served from 1947 to 1950. In Budapest he conducted the major Mozart operas and Fidelio, Tannhäuser, Lohengrin and Die Meistersinger, as well as works from the Italian repertory, and many concerts.

In March 1948 Klemperer made his first post-war appearance in London, conducting the Philharmonia Orchestra. He conducted Bach's Third Orchestral Suite from the harpsichord, Stravinsky's Symphony in Three Movements and Beethoven's Eroica Symphony.

Klemperer left the Budapest post in 1950, frustrated by the political interference of the communist regime. He held no permanent conductorship for the next nine years. In the early 1950s he freelanced in Argentina, Australia, Austria, Britain, Canada, France, Germany and elsewhere.Potts, Joseph E. "Orchestral Concerts in Paris", The Musical Times, October 1951, p. 446 In London in 1951 he conducted two Philharmonia concerts at the new Royal Festival Hall, eliciting high praise from reviewers. The music critic of The Times wrote:

After this, Klemperer's seemingly resurgent career received another severe set-back. At Montreal airport later in 1951 he slipped on ice and fell, breaking his hip. He was hospitalised for eight months. Then for a year he and his family were, as he put it, virtually prisoners in the US because of obstacles to leaving the country, following new legislation. With the help of an accomplished lawyer, he secured temporary six-month passports in 1954, and moved with his wife and daughter to Switzerland. He settled in Zürich, and obtained German citizenship and right of residency in Switzerland.

London

From the mid-1950s, Klemperer's domestic base was in Zürich and his musical base in London, where his career became associated with the Philharmonia. It was widely regarded as the best orchestra in Britain in the 1950s: Grove's Dictionary of Music and Musicians described it as "an elite whose virtuosity transformed British concert life", and The Times called it "the Rolls-Royce of British orchestras"."Mr Walter Legge", The Times, 16 November 1979, p. 29 Its founder and proprietor, Walter Legge, engaged a range of prominent conductors for his concerts. By the early 1950s the most closely identified with the orchestra was Herbert von Karajan, but he was clearly the heir apparent to the ailing Furtwängler as chief conductor of the Berlin Philharmonic and the Salzburg Festival; anticipating that Karajan would become unavailable to the Philharmonia, Legge built up a relationship with Klemperer, who was admired by the players, the critics and the public.Previn, pp. 20, 159, 174 and 183

Legge was a senior producer for Columbia, part of the EMI recording group. As Columbia paid for the rehearsals for recordings, Legge's concerts tended to feature works he had recorded immediately beforehand, so that the orchestra was fully rehearsed at no cost to him. This suited Klemperer, who though he disliked making recordings enjoyed the luxury of "hav[ing] time to prepare a work properly".

According to the critic William Mann, Klemperer's repertory by now was:

In 1957 Legge launched the Philharmonia Chorus, which made its debut in Beethoven's Ninth Symphony conducted by Klemperer. In The Observer Heyworth wrote that with "what promises to be our best choir [and] our best orchestra and a great conductor", Legge had given London "a Beethoven cycle that any city in the world, be it Vienna or New York, would envy".

Wieland Wagner invited Klemperer to conduct Tristan und Isolde at the 1959 Holland Festival, and they agreed to collaborate on Die Meistersinger at Bayreuth, but neither plan was realised, because Klemperer suffered a further physical setback: in October 1958 while smoking in bed he set his bedclothes alight. His burns were life-threatening, and his recovery slow. It was not for nearly a year, until September 1959, that he recovered his health enough to conduct again. On Klemperer's return to the Philharmonia, Legge stood before the orchestra and appointed him conductor for life – the Philharmonia's first principal conductor. Klemperer's concerts in the 1960s included more works from outside the core German repertory, including Bartók's Divertimento, and symphonies by Berlioz, Dvořák, Mahler and Tchaikovsky.

Klemperer returned to opera in 1961, making his Covent Garden début in Fidelio for which he directed the staging as well as the music. He had to a considerable extent moved away from the experimental stagings of the Kroll years; the 1961 Fidelio was described as "traditional, unfussy, grandly conceived, and profoundly revealing", and of "deep serenity" musically. Klemperer directed and conducted another Fidelio in Zürich the following year, at the opera house, only a few hundred yards from his home. He battled with entrenched interests in the Zürich orchestra to secure the best players, but he succeeded and the performances were well received. At Covent Garden he later directed and conducted two more new productions: Die Zauberflöte (1962), and Lohengrin (1963), neither of which was as well reviewed as Fidelio.

Later years
During the early 1960s Legge became disenchanted with the orchestral music scene. His freedom to programme what he pleased was hampered by new committees at the Festival Hall and EMI, and his orchestra was less in demand in the studios. In March 1964, with no advance warning to the orchestra, he issued a press statement announcing that "after the fulfilment of its present commitments the activities of the Philharmonia Orchestra will be suspended for an indefinite period." Klemperer said that Legge had not warned him beforehand of the announcement, although Legge later maintained that he had done so. With Klemperer's strong support the players refused to be disbanded and formed themselves into a self-governing ensemble as the New Philharmonia Orchestra (NPO). They elected him as their president. He remained in the position until his retirement eight years later.

In his later years Klemperer returned to the Jewish faith, and was a strong supporter of the state of Israel. He visited his younger sister, who lived there, and while in Jerusalem in 1970 he accepted the offer of Israeli citizenship, though continuing to retain his German citizenship and permanent Swiss residency.

As Klemperer aged, his concentration and control of the orchestra declined. At one recording session he dozed off while conducting, and he found his hearing and eyesight under strain from concentrating for the length of a concert. One of his players told André Previn, "Sadly, he got a bit deaf and shaky. You'd be thinking 'poor old Klemperer', then suddenly the veil of infirmity would drop and he'd be wonderfully vigorous again." Klemperer continued to conduct and record with the New Philharmonia until the last concert of his career – at the Festival Hall on 26 September 1971 – and his final recording session two days later. The programme for the concert was Beethoven's King Stephen overture, and Fourth Piano Concerto, with Daniel Adni as soloist, and Brahms's Third Symphony. The recording, with the orchestra's wind players, was of Mozart's Serenade No. 11 in E flat, K. 375.

The following January, after flying from Zürich to London to conduct Bruckner's Seventh Symphony, Klemperer announced the day before the concert that he could no longer cope with the strain of public performances. He hoped to be able to go on making recordings, as he felt he might be able to manage the shorter spans of recording takes, and intended to conduct Mozart's Die Entführung aus dem Serail and Bach's St John Passion for EMI, but neither plan came to fruition.
Heyworth writes about the conductor's last years:

Klemperer retired to his home in Zürich, where he died in his sleep on 6 July 1973. His wife predeceased him and he was survived by their two children. He was buried in the Jewish cemetery at Friesenberg, Zürich, four days later.

Compositions
Klemperer said, "I am mainly a conductor who also composes. Naturally, I would be glad to be remembered as a conductor and as a composer." German conductors of his generation began their careers when it was rare for a conductor not to compose: composition was seen as part of the traditional training of a kapellmeister. He began composing at an early age, and started writing songs in his mid-teens. He extensively revised some of his compositions and destroyed others.

Hearing Debussy's opera Pelléas et Mélisande in Prague in 1908 changed Klemperer's compositional ideas. He later viewed the music he composed after that as his first mature works. He continued to write songs, both orchestral and with piano – there were about 100 in all – and in about 1915 he wrote two operas, Wehen (meaning "labour pains") and Das Ziel (The Goal). Neither was publicly staged, although the composer conducted a private concert performance of Das Ziel in Berlin in 1931. The "Merry Waltz" from the latter is the best-known of his compositions. Of his nine string quartets, eight survive. EMI recorded the Seventh in 1970. In 1919 he composed a Missa Sacra for soloists, chorus and orchestra, and also a setting of Psalm 23.

Klemperer gave the premiere of his First Symphony with the Concertgebouw Orchestra in Amsterdam in 1961, and that of the final version of his Second with the New Philharmonia in 1969, recording it for EMI a few weeks later. He wrote six symphonies. Harold Schonberg, music critic of The New York Times, said that the First Symphony, with its incorporation of the Marseillaise in the second movement, "sounded like Charles Ives in one of his wilder moments". When the recording of the Second Symphony was issued in 1970, the critic Edward Greenfield wrote, "There is a gritty quality about much of Klemperer's fast music [with] sharp-edged unison passages ... but give Klemperer a slow tempo and he will melt with amazing rapidity ... the slow movement is astonishingly sweet, with one passage – clarinet over pizzicato strings – recalling the world of Lehár or even Viennese café music." The critic Meirion Bowen wrote of the same work that it was "the product of an outstanding conductor musing on the works of composers he has championed throughout his career".

Recordings

Although he did not enjoy recording, Klemperer's discography is extensive. His first recording was an acoustic set of the slow movement of Bruckner's Eighth Symphony, made for Polydor in 1924 with the Staatskapelle Berlin. His early recordings include Beethoven symphonies and less characteristic repertoire including the first recording of Ravel's Alborada del gracioso, and "Nuages" and "Fêtes" from Debussy's Nocturnes (1926). Then, in between recordings of mostly German classics – including works by Brahms, Bruckner, Mendelssohn, Schubert, Richard Strauss and Wagner – he ventured into the light French repertoire with the overtures to Fra Diavolo and La belle Hélène (1929).

From the Los Angeles years there is only one purpose-made studio recording but several transcriptions of live radio broadcasts, ranging from symphonies by Beethoven, Bruckner and Dvořák to excerpts from operas by Gounod, Massenet, Puccini and Verdi. There are no commercial studio recordings from Klemperer's time in Budapest, but live performances in the opera house or on air were recorded and have been issued on CD, including complete sets of Lohengrin, Fidelio, The Magic Flute, The Tales of Hoffmann, Die Meistersinger and Così fan tutte, all sung in Hungarian.

For the Vox label Klemperer recorded several sets in Vienna in 1951, including Beethoven's Missa solemnis praised by Legge as "grave and powerful". In the same year his broadcast performances in the Concertgebouw of Mahler's Kindertotenlieder and Second Symphony, with the soloists Jo Vincent and Kathleen Ferrier, were recorded and have been issued on disc by Decca. During the 1950s many other live broadcasts conducted by Klemperer were recorded, and later published on CD, with orchestras including the Bavarian Radio Symphony, Concertgebouw, Cologne Radio Symphony, RIAS Symphony, Berlin and the Vienna Symphony.

In October 1954 Klemperer made the first of his many recordings with the Philharmonia: Mozart's Jupiter Symphony. ("Extremely impressive ... epic", commented The Gramophone, "carried through unfalteringly to the end.") Between then and 1972 he conducted the orchestra, and its successor, the New Philharmonia, in recordings of nearly two hundred different works. With the original Philharmonia they included more Mozart symphonies, complete symphony cycles of Beethoven and Brahms, symphonies by Berlioz, Mendelssohn, Schubert, Schumann, Bruckner, Dvořák, Tchaikovsky and Mahler, and other orchestral works by, among others, Bach, Johann Strauss, Richard Strauss, Stravinsky, Wagner and Weill.

From the choral repertoire he and the Philharmonia Chorus and Orchestra recorded Bach's St Matthew Passion, Handel's Messiah and Brahms's German Requiem. His complete opera recordings with the Philharmonia were Fidelio and The Magic Flute. Solo singers in these recordings included Dietrich Fischer-Dieskau, Gottlob Frick, Christa Ludwig, Peter Pears, Elisabeth Schwarzkopf and Jon Vickers.

After the players reconstituted themselves as the New Philharmonia in 1964 Klemperer worked extensively with them in the studios, recording eight symphonies by Haydn, three by Schumann, four by Bruckner and two by Mahler. A complete Beethoven piano concerto cycle featured Daniel Barenboim as soloist. The major choral recordings were of Beethoven's Missa solemnis and Bach's B minor Mass. Reviewing the former, Alec Robertson wrote that it "must take its place on the heights among the greatest recordings of our time". The Bach set divided critical opinion: Robertson called it "a spiritual experience ... a glorious achievement"; the Stereo Record Guide, though conceding "the majesty of Klemperer's conception", found it "disappointing ... with plodding tempi". There were four complete operas: Così fan tutte, Don Giovanni, Der fliegende Holländer and The Marriage of Figaro. Soloists included, among the women, Janet Baker, Teresa Berganza, Mirella Freni, Anja Silja and Elisabeth Söderström, and among the men, Theo Adam, Gabriel Bacquier, Geraint Evans, Nicolai Gedda and Nicolai Ghiaurov.

Honours, legacy and reputation
Honours and legacy
In 1933 Klemperer was presented with the Goethe Medal by President Hindenburg in Berlin. He was awarded the Leipzig Orchestral Nikisch Prize in 1966, and held honorary degrees from Occidental College and the University of California, Los Angeles. In 1971 he was appointed an honorary member of the Royal Academy of Music in London. From Germany he held the Grand Medal of Merit with Star (1958) and the Order of Merit (1967).

The first movement from Klemperer's 1959 Philharmonia recording of Beethoven's Fifth Symphony was selected by NASA for inclusion on the Voyager Golden Record, sent into space on the Voyager space craft. The record contained sounds and images selected as examples of the diversity of life and culture on Earth.

In 1973 Lotte Klemperer presented the Royal Academy of Music with a collection of her father's books and marked-up scores, together with a portrait and some of his batons. This is now known as the Otto Klemperer Collection. One of the academy's two named professorships in conducting is the Klemperer Chair (currently, at 2023, held by Semyon Bychkov).

ReputationThe Washington Post's music critic Joseph McLellan wrote when Klemperer died, "An age of giants has ended ... They are all gone: Toscanini, Walter, Furtwängler, Beecham, Szell, Reiner, and, now Klemperer." The Times said that in Britain he had been revered as the greatest of living conductors. In the view of Grove's Dictionary, following Toscanini’s retirement in April 1954 and Furtwängler's death seven months later, Klemperer was "generally accepted as the most authoritative interpreter of the central Austro-German repertory".

Many musicians disagreed with Klemperer's way of conducting Mozart. Sir Neville Cardus of The Guardian observed, "It was not for him the gallant Mozart presented by Sir Thomas Beecham; far from it. Klemperer's Mozart was made of sterner stuff." Mann complained that the conductor's direction of The Marriage of Figaro was "didactic, humourless, tortoise-like", though his colleague Stanley Sadie found "Klemperer's leisured, cool, almost dispassionate view of the opera is not without its attractiveness. ... The deliberation and the poise are not what we are used to in Figaro, and they say something about it which is worth hearing." It was not only in Mozart that Klemperer's tempi attracted adverse comment: a frequent criticism in his later years was that his tempi were slow. The EMI producer Suvi Raj Grubb wrote:

Cardus expressed regret that Klemperer had too rarely been allowed to programme Bruckner, "whose symphonies he encompassed with a grip and a vision which saw the end of a large musical shape in the beginning". Cardus added:

It was as a Beethoven conductor that Klemperer became most celebrated. The Record Guide said of the 1951 recording of the Missa solemnis, "it is seldom that we hear in the concert hall a performance so clear, so fervent and so musical as that which Klemperer has achieved ... [with] the impression of sublimity achieved by this splendid performance." Of his contemporaneous recording of the Fifth Symphony, the same writers called it "a really individual reading", preferable to those of Toscanini, Walter or Erich Kleiber: "Klemperer treats the work as if he had just discovered its greatness, illuminating every page with a ceaseless care for detail." Mann wrote of the 1962 recording of Fidelio, "the performance is so stunning that after it operagoers may almost despair of hearing a Fidelio'' that will not prove a disappointment." The Philharmonia's first horn, Alan Civil, said, "It took a Klemperer to throw fresh light on Beethoven, and I found his Beethoven cycles marvellous. I mean, I don't want to play Beethoven with any other conductor", and a colleague from the orchestra said, "It's as though Beethoven himself were standing there."

Notes, references and sources

Notes

References

Sources

External links

Beating Time: a play by Jim Grover about Klemperer
The Stanford Collection. A comprehensive film archive, collected by Dr Charles Barber
portrait of Otto Klemperer and Johanna Geisler by Nickolas Muray
 

1885 births
1973 deaths
American people of Czech-Jewish descent
American male conductors (music)
20th-century American conductors (music)
Berlin University of the Arts alumni
German male classical composers
German classical composers
Knights Commander of the Order of Merit of the Federal Republic of Germany
German conductors (music)
German male conductors (music)
Jewish emigrants from Nazi Germany to the United States
Jewish classical composers
Naturalized citizens of Israel
Musicians from Wrocław
People from the Province of Silesia
People with bipolar disorder
Recipients of the Pour le Mérite (civil class)
Honorary Members of the Royal Academy of Music
Hoch Conservatory alumni
American male classical composers
American classical composers
20th-century American composers
20th-century American male musicians
Music Academy of the West founders
Naturalized citizens of the United States
American people of Sephardic-Jewish descent
American people of Bohemian descent
American people of German-Jewish descent
Prussian emigrants to the United States
19th-century Prussian people